Mian Deh or Meyan Deh or Miyandeh or Miandeh or Meyandeh may refer to:

Afghanistan
Mian Deh, Badakhshan
Mian Deh, Takhar

Iran
Miyan Deh, Fasa, Fars Province
Miandeh, Zarrin Dasht, Fars Province
Miandeh, Rasht, Gilan Province
Miandeh, Rudsar, Gilan Province
Miandeh, Sowme'eh Sara, Gilan Province
Miandeh-ye Pain, Gilan Province
Mian Deh, Hamadan
Mian Deh, Baft, Kerman Province
Mian Deh, Jiroft, Kerman Province
Mian Deh, Jebalbarez, Jiroft County, Kerman Province
Mian Deh, Rudbar-e Jonubi, Kerman Province
Mian Deh, Chalus, Mazandaran Province
Miandeh, Juybar, Mazandaran Province
Miyandeh, Razavi Khorasan
Miyan Deh Rural District, in Fars Province

See also
Deh Mian (disambiguation)